The 1999 NAPA 500 was a NASCAR Winston Cup Series racing event held on November 21, 1999, at Atlanta Motor Speedway in the American community of Hampton, Georgia. It was the 34th and final race of the 1999 NASCAR Winston Cup Series season.

Background
Atlanta Motor Speedway is one of ten  intermediate to hold NASCAR races; the others are Charlotte Motor Speedway, Chicagoland Speedway, Darlington Raceway, Homestead Miami Speedway, Kansas Speedway, Kentucky Speedway, Las Vegas Motor Speedway, New Hampshire Motor Speedway, and Texas Motor Speedway. The track's turns are banked at twenty-four degrees, while the front stretch, the location of the finish line, and the back stretch are banked at five.

Entry list

Qualifying

Summary
Out of the 49 drivers who were on the entry list, only 43 drivers managed to make the race. Two of the more notable drivers who did not qualify were Darrell Waltrip and Morgan Shepherd. There were numerous accidents causing a series of yellow flags. Each green flag run was 30 laps while more than 16% of the race was run under a caution flag.

Todd Bodine was the last-place finisher of this 325-lap event that lasted for a duration of three and a half hours. A live audience of 165,000 NASCAR enthusiasts came to see 38 different lead changes along with eight cautions lasting 53 laps. In addition, the pole position was Kevin Lepage's for the only time in his NASCAR career.

Chevrolet and Ford vehicles were the dominant vehicles in the lineup. All of the drivers on the grid were born in the United States of America; a far cry from the racing done in the late-2000s and early-2010s where now-retired Colombian driver Juan Pablo Montoya and now-retired Australian driver Marcos Ambrose routinely raced in the NASCAR schedule. Ten drivers failed to finish the race, including Joe Nemechek. This was the final race for Rudd Performance Motorsports and the #10 Tide ride. It was also the final race for Ken Schrader in the #33 car before moving to MB2 Motorsports in 2000. This was also the final race for Jerry Nadeau competing in the #36 car before making the move to Hendrick Motorsports in 2000. This was the last race without Matt Kenseth until the 2015 AAA Texas 500.

Notable crew chiefs who actively participated in the race included Robin Pemberton, Larry McReynolds, Travis Carter, Todd Parrott, and Junie Donlavey.

The total prize amount offered to the drivers was $2,232,402 ($ when adjusted for inflation); the winner received $174,300 ($ when adjusted for inflation) while the last-place finisher received a meager $33,507 ($ when adjusted for inflation).

The 1999 NAPA 500 was the last NASCAR race of the 1990s decade.

Results

References

NAPA
NAPA 500
NASCAR races at Atlanta Motor Speedway